Pitcaple is a hamlet in Aberdeenshire, Scotland on the River Urie 4 miles (6 km) northwest of Inverurie.

Nearby Pitcaple Castle is a 17th-century country house which was restored by William Burn in 1830. It was built close to the remains of a 15th-century tower house.

There is a disused railway station.

William Alexander

The journalist and author, William Alexander (1826 - 1894) was brought up on Damhead Farm near Pitcaple.

References

Hamlets in Scotland
Villages in Aberdeenshire
Inverurie